The Glavacioc is a left tributary of the river Câlniștea in Romania. It discharges into the Câlniștea near Cămineasca. It flows through the villages Ștefan cel Mare, Glavacioc, Brătești, Cătunu, Poeni, Butești, Puranii de Sus, Purani, Baciu, Blejești, Videle, Rădulești, Crevenicu, Merenii de Sus, Merenii de Jos, Ștefeni, Letca Veche and Ghimpați.

Tributaries

The following rivers are tributaries to the river Glavacioc:

Left: Glavaciocul Mare, Fătăceni, Valea de Margine, Milcovăț
Right: Vii, Căldăraru, Sericu

References

Rivers of Romania
Rivers of Argeș County
Rivers of Teleorman County
Rivers of Giurgiu County